General elections are due to be held in Mauritius in 2024.

Electoral system 
The National Assembly has 62 elected members elected in 20 three-seat constituencies and one two-seat constituency (the island of Rodrigues). The elections are held using the block vote system, whereby voters have as many votes as there are seats available.

In addition to the elected members, the Electoral Supervisory Commission has the power to appoint a further eight members. The additional members are chosen from amongst the unsuccessful candidates who received the highest number of votes, and are appointed with the aim of balancing the parliamentary representation of different ethnic groups.

References 

Mauritius
General election
Elections in Mauritius